Emília Freitas (1855–1908) was a Brazilian novelist, poet and teacher. She wrote what is considered the first Brazilian fantasy novel, A Rainha do Ignoto (1899), about an utopian society inhabited by women.

Life
Freitas was born in 1855, in Aracati, in the then province of Ceará. She was the daughter of the lieutenant colonel Antonio José de Freitas and Maria de Jesus Freitas. After her father's death, the family decides to move to Fortaleza, where Freitas studied French, English, geography and arithmetics in a private school.

Later she moves to the Normal School, becoming a teacher. In 1873 she began to write poems for several literary newspapers of Ceará and Pará like O Libertador, O Cearense and O lyrio e a brisa. Most of these poems were later compiled in the volume titled Canções do lar (1891). A year later, after her mother's death, she moved to Manaus with his brother, teaching at the Instituto Benjamin Constant for boys.

In 1900, she married and returned to her home state with her husband, the journalist Antonio Vieira, editor of Jornal de Fortaleza. de Freitas participated actively in the Sociedade das Cearenses Libertadoras, an abolitionist society, having even spoken in 1893 in the gallery, a fact that was much applauded and reported in the newspapers.

In 1899, she published her main work, A Rainha do Ignoto,  which was called a "psychological novel". The book, about an   utopical island ruled by a society of women, is considered by some experts as one of the pioneering works of the fantasy genre in Brazil. Out of print since its first release, the book got its second edition in 1980, becoming rediscovered and subject of  feminist literary criticism studies.

On October 18, 1908, Emília Freitas died in Manaus, to where she had returned after the death of her husband.

Works
 1891- Canções do lar, poems;
 1899 - A Rainha do Ignoto, novel
 unknown- O Renegado, novel

References

External links 

 
 

1855 births
1908 deaths
Brazilian fantasy writers
19th-century Brazilian women writers
Brazilian science fiction writers